Innkeeper's Lodge is a UK budget hotel chain owned by Mitchells & Butlers.

Locations
Innkeeper's Lodge has over 40 locations across the UK from Balloch  to Exeter. Some are new  purpose built hotels, others are pubs with rooms and a few are within historic buildings (such as the Hawes Inn). Hotels are always located next to a restaurant which is also owned by Mitchells & Butlers such as Harvester, Toby Carvery & Crown Carveries.

Overview
Most hotels rooms are designed to the same style and all feature en-suite bathrooms. and tea & coffee making facilities.

After mass surveying, in 2004 every hotel room in the company became non-smoking.

In 2012, 52 hotels (mainly purpose built hotels rather than physically joined to or above Inns) were sold off to another budget hotel group Travelodge. This left Innkeepers Lodge with less than half of their original number of hotels left. There remain some joined premises however, such as at Borehamwood where the lobby is shared between both the Toby Carvery and Travelodge. As a result, the Toby Inn website for this branch retains a page called 'Hotel Rooms' which is a simple link to Travelodge, whereas the Travelodge website claims this hotel does not offer a cooked breakfast - true, in a strict sense, whereas of course the Toby Inn puts a special buffet breakfast on every morning from 8am for hotel guests (who do not even have to leave the building) and the general public.

References

External links
 Official Website

Hotel chains in the United Kingdom
Mitchells & Butlers